Them Again is the second album by the Northern Irish band, Them, whose lead singer and songwriter was Van Morrison. The album was released by Decca Records in the UK on 21 January 1966 but it failed to chart. In the U.S. it was released in April 1966 where it peaked at #138 on the Billboard charts.

Songs
Two of the original Van Morrison songs included on the album, "My Lonely Sad Eyes" and "Hey Girl", can be seen as precursors to the poetic musings of Morrison's later Astral Weeks album, released in 1968. "My Lonely Sad Eyes" begins with the words, "Fill me my cup, and I'll drink your sparkling wine/Pretend that everything is fine, 'til I see your sad eyes."  The title implies that the sad eyes belong to the singer but the lyrics address the singer's love interest. The song "Hey Girl" has a pastoral feel to it, enhanced by the addition of flutes and in Brian Hinton's opinion is a "dry run for 'Cyprus Avenue'" from Astral Weeks. The cover version of Bob Dylan's "It's All Over Now, Baby Blue", is considered by author Clinton Heylin to be "that genuine rarity, a Dylan cover to match the original." Among the Van Morrison originals and cover versions found on the album, four of producer Tommy Scott's original compositions are also included.

Like "Gloria" from the first LP, "I Can Only Give You Everything" became popular with other groups, and was performed by a number of US garage bands. It was recorded by numerous acts including The Troggs, The Liverpool Five, The Haunted, The Little Boy Blues, The MC5, The Clefs, Richard Hell, and Little Bob Story. French language versions include those by Les Sultans (as "Tu es impossible"), Ronnie Bird, and Sylvie Vartan (both as "Chante"). In 2007 The San Franciscan band The Ex-Boyfriends released a version.

Side 1
"Could You, Would You"  (Van Morrison) – 3:15
"Something You Got"  (Chris Kenner) – 2:36
"Call My Name"  (Tommy Scott) – 2:23
"Turn On Your Love Light"  (Deadric Malone,  Joseph Wade Scott) – 2:18
"I Put a Spell on You"  (Screamin' Jay Hawkins) – 2:40
"I Can Only Give You Everything"  (Phil Coulter, Tommy Scott) – 2:43
"My Lonely Sad Eyes" (Van Morrison) – 2:27
"I Got a Woman"  (Ray Charles, Renald Richard) – 3:16

Side 2
"Out of Sight"  (James Brown, Ted Wright) – 2:26
"It's All Over Now, Baby Blue"  (Bob Dylan) – 3:52
"Bad or Good"  (Van Morrison) – 2:09
"How Long Baby"  (M. Gillon aka Tommy Scott) – 3:41
"Hello Josephine"  (Dave Bartholomew, Fats Domino) – 2:06
"Don't You Know"   (Tommy Scott) – 2:26
"Hey Girl"  (Van Morrison) – 2:59
"Bring 'em On In"  (Van Morrison) – 3:46

Track listing (U.S. edition)

Side 1
"Could You, Would You"  (Morrison) – 3:13
"Something You Got"  (Chris Kenner) – 2:35
"Call My Name"  (Tommy Scott) – 2:22
"Turn on Your Love Light"  (Deadric Malone, Joseph Wade Scott) – 2:22
"I Can Only Give You Everything"  (Phil Coulter,  Tommy Scott) – 2:43
"My Lonely Sad Eyes"  (Morrison) – 2:31

Side 2
"Out of Sight"  (James Brown, Ted Wright) – 2:24
"It's All Over Now, Baby Blue"  (Bob Dylan) – 3:50
"Bad Or Good"  (Morrison) – 2:09
"How Long Baby"  (M. Gillon aka Tommy Scott) – 3:40
"Don't You Know"  (Tommy Scott) – 2:26
"Bring 'em On In"  (Morrison) – 3:45

References

Sources
Heylin, Clinton (2003). Can You Feel the Silence? Van Morrison: A New Biography, Chicago Review Press 

Van Morrison albums
Them (band) albums
1966 albums
Decca Records albums